The Middle East Report  is a magazine published by the Middle East Research and Information Project (MERIP). The headquarters is in Tacoma, Washington.

History and profile
MERIP began in 1971 by releasing an irregularly scheduled six-page newsletter called the MERIP Reports.  In 1973, the group began releasing this newsletter on a scheduled basis.

In its online version, the Middle East Report  is made available in a mixed access mode, with some open access articles and others requiring a paid subscription. The subscription covers both online and print editions.

Opinions
The magazine is consistently critical of Israel, Zionism, and the foreign relations of the United States in the Middle East. In 2014, the editor wrote:

Readership
The magazine is available in the United States, Europe, the Middle East, and online worldwide.

Staff
Until 1995, Joe Stork was editor-in-chief.

References

Magazines established in 1973
Magazines published in Washington, D.C.
Quarterly magazines published in the United States
Political magazines published in the United States